Korea Land & Housing Corporation (LH) is a government-owned corporation which is responsible for the development of land in cities, and the maintenance and management of land and housing.

Foundation Basis 
LH was built by law to form the Korea Land Development Corporation, and the Korea Housing Corporation. The two companies were merged in 2009 by the government to form the current LH.

Foundation Reason 
Under the government's plan to advance the public corporations, it aims to eliminate overlapping functions, such as the establishment of housing development projects carried out by the Korea Housing Corporation and Korea Land Corporation, and to contribute to the development of the national economy by providing new funds.

History

Korea Land Corporation 

 Founded on April 1, 1975, Korea Land Corporation's predecessor, the Land Safety Fund.
 March 27, 1979, Korea Land Development Corporation.
 December 31, 1980 A housing development project started under the Act on Promotion of Housing Site Development.
 September 13, 1988 Construction of the First New Towns in the Seoul Metropolitan Area Based on the Two Million Housing Construction Plan. (Bundang, Ilsan, Pyeongchon, Middle East)
 1 January 1996, Changing name as Korea Land Corporation.
 December 21, 2001, The first phase of the construction of the second largest new city in the Seoul Metropolitan Area (Pangyo, Dongtan, Yangchon and Okjeong)
 December 27, 2002 Started the Gaesong Industrial Complex Project.
 March 19, 2007, 6 Innovative city projects were launched, including Kimchun Innovation City in North Gyeongsang Province.
 December 14, 2007, The government pushed for the construction of the 3rd New Town in the Seoul Metropolitan Area to stabilize the real estate market (Songpa, Dongtan, and Geomdan).
 January 1, 2008, New BI L + (L +) Official Announcement.

Korea Housing Corporation 

 July 1, 1962 Korea Housing Corporation was established.
 In 1962, Korea's first apartment complex constructed.(Mapo)
 In 1965, Creating a large-scale housing complex (132,232 m2, Hwagok-dong, Gangseo, Seoul)
 In 1971, First Rental Apartment Building (Open Dong)
 In 1978, Construction of Jamsil Apartment (19,180) (1975 - 1978)
 In 1979, Construction of Banpo Apartment Complex  (No. 7,906) (1971 - 1979)
 In 1983, Construction of Gaepo Apartment Complex  (No. 1, 5710) (1979-1983)
 In 1984, Construction of Gwacheon New Town (13,522)  (1980 to 1984)
 In 1987, Construction of apartments in Jung-gu, Seoul (1984 - 1987)
 In 1989, Construction of Sanggye New Town (42,874)  (1986-1989)
 In 1997, moving to Bundang New Building
 In 1998, Construction of Korea's First National Rental Housing (Suwon pavilion) 
 In 2002, Named Green Building Certification Body
 In 2004, Construction of Korea's first 10-year public rental apartment (Osan Bridge)
 In 2005, Housing construction number 1.66 million achieved
 In 2006, a public housing development project was launched (Pangyo, Sungnam City).
 In 2007, Housing Construction reached 1.95 million
 In 2007, First Public Enterprise Department Organizational Reform
 In 2007, Korea's Best Housing Service Awards (Best of Green Section)
Korea Land & Housing Corporation
 In Oct 2009, Korea Housing Corporation and Korea Land Corporation were integrated into the Korea Land and Housing Corporation.
 May 4, 2015 Moving the Headquarters to Jinju City

Apartment Brand 
 Humansia
 Tranchae
 Jugong Green Ville
 A Thousand Trees

References 

Government-owned companies of South Korea
South Korean companies established in 2009